The Woodson County Courthouse, located in Courthouse Square in Yates Center, is the seat of government of Woodson County, Kansas. Woodson County was created by the territorial legislature in 1857. Neosho Falls was selected as the first county seat. Between 1865 and 1875, the county seat moved several times, alternating between Neosho Falls and Kalida, then to Defiance, and finally, in 1876, to the newly laid out Yates Center in the center of the county.

Built from 1899 to 1900, the courthouse was the second in Yates Center and replaced a wooden building moved to the city from Defiance. Architect George P. Washburn, who designed thirteen county courthouses in Kansas, designed the building; its design is similar to Washburn's Kingman County Courthouse. The brick courthouse sits on a limestone base and has a Late Victorian design which includes elements of the Romanesque Revival, Queen Anne, and Free Classical styles. The building is topped by four corner towers and a central cupola. Three of the courthouse's four entrances feature arched doorways surrounded by porches, while the north entrance has a large limestone arch around the doorway and no porch. The first and second floor windows are rectangular, while the attic windows are arched and sit atop the second floor windows; all sets of windows are connected by stone bands encircling the building.

The courthouse was added to the National Register of Historic Places on October 10, 1985. It is part of the Yates Center Courthouse Square Historic District, which is also on the National Register.

References

External links

Courthouses on the National Register of Historic Places in Kansas
Victorian architecture in Kansas
Romanesque Revival architecture in Kansas
Queen Anne architecture in Kansas
Government buildings completed in 1900
Buildings and structures in Woodson County, Kansas
County courthouses in Kansas
National Register of Historic Places in Woodson County, Kansas